The United States Attorney for the District of Indiana was the United States attorney responsible for representing the United States in the United States District Court for the District of Indiana. The U.S. Attorney prosecuted criminal cases and acted on behalf of the Federal Government both defending and prosecuting civil cases.  The District of Indiana was created on March 3, 1817. The longest established district, at 111 years, it was finally  divided into the Northern District of Indiana and the Southern District of Indiana on April 21, 1928.

Office holders
 Elijah Sparks 1813–1814 (Indiana Territory)
 William Hendricks 1814–1817 (Indiana Territory)
 Thomas H. Blake 1817–1818
 Alexander A. Meek 1818–1821
 Charles Dewey  1821–1829
 Samuel Judah 1829–1833
 Tilghman Howard 1833–1839
 John Pettit 1839–1841
 Courtland Cushing 1841–1845
 Daniel Mace 1845–1848
 Lucien Barbour 1848–1850
 Hugh O'Neal 1850–1854
 Benjamin Thomas 1854–1856
 Alvin Peterson Hovey 1856–1858
 Daniel W. Voorhees 1858–1861
 John Hanna 1861–1866
 Alfred Kilgore 1866–1869
 Thomas M. Browne 1869–1875
 Nelson Trusler 1876–1880
 Charles L. Holstein 1880–1885
 John Edward Lamb 10 July 1885 – 16 August 1886
 David Turfire 1886–1887
 Emory B. Sellers 1887–1889
 Solomon Claypool 1889
 Smiley N. Chambers 1889–1893
 Frank B. Burke 1893–1897
 Albert W. Wishard 1897–1901
 Joseph B. Kealing 1901–1909
 Charles W. Miller 1909–1913
 Frank C. Dailey 1913–1916
 Lemuel Ertus Slack 1916–1918
 Frederick Van Nuys 1919–1921
 Homer Elliott 1922–1924
 Alexander G. Cavins 1925
 Albert Ward 1925–1928
 George L. Rulison 1928

See also
 List of former United States district courts#Indiana

References